Jakhelln is a Norwegian surname of:

Christian Albrecht Jackhelln (1784–1868), Norwegian businessman and politician
Christian Albrecht Jakhelln (1863–1945), Norwegian businessman and politician
Christian Albrecht Jakhelln, Jr. (1903–1991), Norwegian businessman and politician
Elise Jakhelln (1909–2002), Norwegian textile artist
Carl Johan Frederik Jakhelln (1914–1987), Norwegian diplomat and writer
Henning Jakhelln (1939–), Norwegian jurist
Cornelius Jakhelln (1977–), Norwegian writer and musician
Anton Frederik Winter Jakhelln Prytz, (1878—1945), Norwegian politician

Norwegian-language surnames